From 1967 to 1973, an extended period of racial unrest occurred in the town of Cairo, Illinois. The city had long had racial tensions which boiled over after a black soldier was found hanged in his jail cell. Over the next several years, fire bombings, racially charged boycotts and shootouts were common place in Cairo, with 170 nights of gunfire reported in 1969 alone.

The unrest was a factor in the depopulation of Cairo.

Background 

Cairo's turbulent history of race relations is often traced back to the lynching of black resident William James. In 1900, Cairo had a population of nearly 13,000. Of that total, approximately 5,000 residents were African-American. In 1900, this was an unusually high black population for a town of Cairo's size, and five percent of all black residents of the state of Illinois resided here. As a result of the large black population in a town with a traditionally southern white heritage, race relations were already strained by 1900. On the night of November 11, 1909, two men were lynched. The first man lynched was a black man named William James, who was allegedly responsible for the murder of Anna Pelly, a young white woman killed three days earlier. The second man lynched was a white man named Henry Salzner, who had allegedly murdered his wife in the previous August.

The decline of the steamboat industry in the early 20th century hurt Cairo's economy significantly. By the time of unrest in the 1960s, the unemployment rate of Cairo was more than twice the national average and poverty was widespread among both blacks and whites in the city.

1967 riot 

The Cairo riot of 1967 was one of 159 race riots that swept cities in the United States during the "Long Hot Summer of 1967".  This riot began on July 17, 1967, and persisted through three days of riots and protests.

The incident began with the alleged jailhouse suicide of Private Robert Hunt, a young African-American soldier on leave in his hometown of Cairo. Police said Hunt hanged himself with his T-shirt, but Cairo's African-American residents challenged that story. The death touched off three days of riots and protests, followed by a seven-year renewal of civil rights activities in the city.

Several shootouts occurred throughout the city and at least six firebombings occurred. Three stores and a warehouse were burned down and a stabbing also occurred.

Timeline

1967 
July 17 - Unrest starts after the suspicious jailhouse suicide of Robert Hunt. Six fire bombings occurred throughout the city, including attacks on three stores and a warehouse.
July 19 - Three fire bombings occurred in the city - two at a lumber yard and one at the home of the lumber yard's foreman. Police also exchanged fire with snipers but no injuries occurred.
July 20 - 100 national guardsmen are recalled after a night of low tensions.
July 21 - A leader of a black group in the city threatened that Cairo would "look like Rome burning down" if a list of demands were not met in 72 hours. Mayor Lee Stenzel held a meeting to a crowd of 400 angry whites in which he told them that the "negro problem" in the city had been brewing for a long time and that he needed more time to deal with it.

1969 
March 31 - Several shootings throughout the city. A police car was hit with bullets, a black man's car had its windows shot out and several white men fired at the Pyramid housing project from the Mississippi River levee.
April 26–28 - A total of 28 fire bombings occurred throughout the city over the weekend. A laundromat, a tavern and a mostly Black high school were bombed while the Tri-County Health center was set alight twice. During the second fire at the health center, firemen attempting to extinguish the flames and the policemen protecting them were fired at. In another incident, policemen tried to enter the Pyramid housing projects to search for a murder weapon, but were confronted by 200 black residents of the projects and forced to leave.
May 1 - 175 National Guardsmen and 30 State Policemen were deployed to Cairo to help the 15-man police force enforce a curfew over the city. Mayor Lee Stenzel, Police Chief Carl Clutts and civic and business leaders city testified at the Illinois State capitol on the unrest. Negro United Front members also protested businesses owned by "White Hats" members.
May 26 - Two waves of violence occurred in 24 hours. In the first incident, a number gunmen attacked the Cairo police station, firing over 100 rounds into the building over the course of 15 minutes. In the second incident, a wallpaper warehouse and the Tri-County Health center were firebombed and responding firemen were shot at. The firemen allowed the health center to burn to the ground as it was scheduled to destroyed due to previous bombings.
June 12–14 - Four fire bombings and two gunfire incidents occurred.
June 15 - Sniper fire and fire bombings occurred throughout Cairo. A large discount store was fire bombed and responding firefighters were shot at. A group of blacks firebombed several white residences and there were total of about a dozen fires. There was speculation that the unrest was related to the appointment of former Alton police chief William Petersen to chief of Cairo police.
June 18 - Policemen engaged in a shootout with an unknown gunmen at an abandoned building. A unoccupied house in a black neighborhood and a storage shed for a lumber company were set on fire as well.
June 20 - A nine-member legislative committee recommended that a 70-man state police force patrol the city and that White Hats members should not be deputized. They also recommended that Governor Richard B. Ogilvie request the federal government to declare a state of emergency so that federal funding for housing and business development be made available.
June 26 - Groups of whites and blacks threw rocks and bricks at each other after a march of 400 whites demanding "equal rights for whites" ended.
July 15 - Six ministers from the United Front of Cairo were evicted from Governor Ogilvie's reception office in Springfield where they had organized a sit-in.
August 28–29 - Scattered gunfire reported throughout the city, including incident in which patrol cars were fired at, but no injuries reported.

1970 
July 23 - Several shootouts between whites and blacks occurred throughout the city, with the heaviest concentration being at the Pyramid Courts housing project.
October 27 - Governor Ogilvie ordered a 24-man state police force as well as an armored car to patrol Cairo for an indefinite period to stop the "indiscriminate gunfire and lawlessness" in the city. The order came after the Cairo police station was attacked with automatic gunfire on three separate occasions.
December 17 - Senator Charles H. Percy was visited in Washington by three Cairo high school students, the mayor and business leaders to discuss bringing peace to city.

Aftermath 
The unrest resulted in a mass exodus from Cairo, which was already experiencing population decline before the unrest began. The population of Cairo has declined from 9,348 in 1960 to approximately 2,359 in 2016. The peak population was 15,203 in 1920.

See also
List of incidents of civil unrest in the United States

References

External links 
 Race Riot in Cairo, Illinois!
 Lessons from Cairo, Illinois

1967 in Illinois
1967 riots
African-American history of Illinois
Cairo, Illinois
Riots and civil disorder in Illinois
African-American riots in the United States
White American riots in the United States
July 1967 events in the United States
Ethnic conflicts
History of racism in Illinois
Urban decay in the United States
1960s in Illinois
1970s in Illinois